Double Branch is a stream in Bates County in the U.S. state of Missouri. It is a tributary to the Marais des Cygnes River.

The stream headwaters arise just north of Missouri Route 52 about six miles east-southeast of Butler and the stream flows under Route 52 to the south-southwest. The stream joins the Marais des Cygnes River at the He Bend four miles northeast of Rich Hill.

Double Branch was named for the fact its watercourse has two branches.

See also
List of rivers of Missouri

References

Rivers of Bates County, Missouri
Rivers of Missouri